Rahim Khan Mosque is a historical mosque in Isfahan, Iran. It was built in the late 19th century. This mosque has an unusual combination of styles in architectural decorations. The shabestan of this mosque is one of the biggest shabestans in Isfahan. The shabestan, portal, iwan and outer surface of the mosque's dome have been rebuilt.

See also 
 List of the historical structures in the Isfahan province

References 

19th-century mosques
Mosques in Isfahan
Mosque buildings with domes